Teratosphaeria is a genus of fungi in the family Teratosphaeriaceae; according to the 2007 Outline of Ascomycota, it was placed in the Phaeosphaeriaceae, but the placement within this family was uncertain.

Species

T. acidotherma
T. agapanthi
T. alboconidia
T. alcornii
T. alistairii
T. altensteinii
T. angophorae
T. associata
T. aurantia
T. australiensis
T. bellula
T. biformis
T. blakelyi
T. brunneotingens
T. calophylla
T. capensis
T. complicata
T. considenianae
T. coolabuniensis
T. corymbiae
T. crispata
T. destructans
T. dimorpha
T. dispersa
T. encephalarti
T. eucalypti
T. fibrillosa
T. flexuosa
T. foliensis
T. gauchensis
T. hortaea
T. jonkershoekensis
T. juvenalis
T. karinae
T. keanei
T. knoxdaviesii
T. lilianiae
T. macowanii
T. maculiformis
T. majorizuluensis
T. marasasii
T. mareebensis
T. maxii
T. mexicana
T. micromaculata
T. microspora
T. miniata
T. multiseptata
T. obscuris
T. ohnowa
T. ovata
T. parva
T. persoonii
T. praelongispora
T. profusa
T. proteae-arboreae
T. pseudoeucalypti
T. stellenboschiana
T. syncarpiae
T. tinara
T. tinarooa
T. toledana
T. veloci
T. velox
T. verrucosa
T. viscida
T. viscidus
T. xenocryptica
T. zuluensis

References

Capnodiales
Dothideomycetes genera